The Oak Ridges Moraine is an ecologically important geological landform in the Mixedwood Plains of south-central Ontario, Canada. Below the approximately 200 meter thick glacial derived sediments of the moraine lies thick bedrock successions of Precambrian rocks and up to 200 meters of Ordovician aged rock (see geology below), capped by a regional unconformity of erosion and non-deposition to the Quaternary period. Rivers and lakes scatter the landscape and are important for creating habitat for the rich diversity of species of animals, trees and shrubbery (see ecology). These are also the supply of fresh water to aquifers in the moraine through complex subterranean connections (see hydrology). Construction development nearby, and with expansion of communities around the moraine in need of potable water, it is a contested site in Ontario, since it stands in the path of major urban development (see political action). This region has been subject to multiple decades of scientific research to study the origins of formation, and how early communities used the land. A larger focus currently is how to source potable water without removing the aquifer entirely (see research section below).

Physiography
The Oak Ridges Moraine is a pair of large ridges composed of four elevated wedges. It is bounded to the west by the Niagara Escarpment, a cuesta which was critical to the formation of the moraine, and to the east by the Trent River and Rice Lake. The four wedges (Albion, Uxbridge, Pontypool and Rice Lake from west to east) formed in stages, though some synchronous formation also occurred at an early period of formation. The moraine peaks at the Uxbridge wedge, generally rising from east to west, a result of the moraine's west-to-east formation. That is, the western portion of the moraine received earlier and more frequent sedimentary deposition than the eastern portion, as the ice lobes which controlled the moraine's eastern formation slowly retreated. The Rice Lake wedge is separated from the other wedges where the Oak Ridges Moraine intersects Rice Lake.

To the north are drumlinized uplands, referred to as the Peterborough drumlin field.

Geological origins

The Oak Ridges Moraine probably formed in the Late Wisconsin glacial period. Ice melt from the Niagara Escarpment flowed into the western boundaries of the moraine, wherein conduits beneath the ice expanded to form a west-to-east passage between the main Laurentide Ice Sheet and a mass of ice in the Lake Ontario basin.

Stratified sediment was deposited rapidly on the high-relief erosional surface. The channel tunnels were primarily created by the erosion from glacial rivers, a typical process before moraine formation.

Characteristic of this moraine is the transition of deposition layers from glaciofluvial to glaciolacustrine. Sedimentary glaciofluvial areas form the core of the Oak Ridges Moraine, though restricted to subglacial cavity fills of confined subaqueous fans. Overlaying this core is a glaciolacustrine sedimentary layer that is younger and topographically lower, principally in the delta and basin areas of the moraine.

In the late stages of its development, random unstratified accumulation (known as diamicton) occurred along the ice margins. Whereas the glacial river deposits were more substantial by volume, the diamicton deposits represent a greater portion of the moraine's exposed surface. Research suggests that sedimentation occurred in a west to east sequence along the four main sedimentary wedges: Albion, Uxbridge, Pontytool and Rice Lake. The wedges may have formed in a relatively short period of time, perhaps no more than a few hundred years, as indicated by the annual deposition cycles in glacial lakes (known as varves) within the moraine sediments. However, the lowest beds in the moraine may have experienced synchronous sedimentation.

Geology

Glacial sediments

In the area of the Oak Ridges Moraine, glacially derived sediments, mainly of Pleistocene age, may overlie a regional unconformity and lower Newmarket till, up to 200 meters thick in some places. Extensive research in the moraine area indicate there may be 6 different periods of sedimentation from the onset of glaciation. These lower deposits are thought to be proglacial lake derived, and contain from bottom to top: York Till, Don Interglacial beds, Scarborough Formation, Sunnybrook Till and Thorncliffe Formation. This unit is thought to extend under Lake Ontario. Cutting into the Newmarket Till is another regional unconformity, which led to coarse grained channel fill sediments. Some channel fills are 10 to 25 meters of gravels or  sands that decrease in grain size during later deposition of slowing meltwater runoff. Channel fill sediments comprise the base of Oak Ridges Moraine sediments, atop the unconformity. Lower deposits of the Oak Ridges Moraine stratigraphic package start as coarse sands and gravels whereas upper sediments are interbedded fine sands and silts. There may also be sequences of sediments decreasing in size from medium sands to silts and clays up to ten's of meters thick. Above these sediments lie clayey-silt to silt till of the Halton Till, at thicknesses reaching .

Glacial lake sediments cap the entire sequence of stratigraphy in the Oak Ridges Moraine, glacial Lake Algonquin and Lake Iroquois. Glacial sediments are subject to erosional forces and valley cutting processes, removing previously laid sediments and placing them further along the river path.

Unconformity

At the Oak Ridges Moraine system, rocks from the Ordovician Period underlie the post-glacial sediment and are a large part of the bedrock geology, aside from the presence of some older basement rock beneath. From the basement rocks to the overlying stratigraphic successions is an unconformity (a gap in the geologic record) where many millions of years of depositional or crystalline record are erased. A large time gap is important in this context to correlate where and when this event occurred with respect to both local and surrounding geology of the lithostratigraphic record. Cause of this sedimentary gap may originate from a couple large scale meltwater events, the Algonquin and Ontarian erosional floods from melting glaciers of the Late Wisconsinan glaciation.

Paleozoic bedrock

Basement layers are composed of Early Ordovician aged dolostone as a first sequence only to be stripped away by erosion in the Middle Ordovician. Sea transgression in the Middle Ordovician brought in a second sequence of deposition as clastic and carbonate sediments above this new unconformity due to sea regression between the Early and Middle Ordovician. A third depositional sequence is found in the Late Ordovician, separated from the Middle Ordovician by local erosion and clastic sediments, consists of a shale base topped with more shale interbedded with limestone and calcareous siltstones. Above this sits an unconformity due to sea regression in the Late Ordovician to Early Silurian time. Large gaps in deposition from the Early Silurian through Mesozoic time allowed large scale erosion to occur in this geographic region to the onset of Quaternary glaciation and subsequent sediment deposition.

Precambrian bedrock

Rocks from the Grenville Province of Precambrian age lie below Ordovician aged limestones and shales in the Oak Ridges Moraine area. These come from a period of continental scale orogeny in eastern North America about 1.2 to 1.3 billion years ago. This area of the Grenville Province is mainly composed of metamorphosed gneiss and mylonite, while also including intrusions of granitic composition as well. Both the metamorphic and igneous rocks are able to better withstand erosional forces from the advancing ice sheets compared to some softer rock types. Softer metamorphic rocks of the Precambrian basement include marbles or metaturbidites, both from sedimentary origin.

Ecology 

The ecologically diverse moraine is the water source for many headwaters streams flowing south into rivers that drain into Lake Ontario and north into rivers that drain into Lake Scugog and Lake Simcoe. Varied landforms on the moraine, such as woodlands, wetlands, watercourses, kettle lakes and bogs, have provided an environment suitable for significant flora and fauna communities to develop and thrive. The moraine contains one of the last large contiguous forested spans in southern Ontario.

Some of the wide variety of plant and animal species found in the moraine are species at risk in Canada and Ontario, including the West Virginia white butterfly, Jefferson salamander, red-shouldered hawk, and American ginseng. Unique ecosystems in the moraine include wetlands similar to those of boreal forests in Northern Ontario, and remnants of tallgrass prairie and oak-pine savanna that are globally threatened ecosystems. A representative portion of the moraine may be found in the Happy Valley Forests, in York Region, north of Toronto.

Hydrology 

A number of features comprise the hydrological system of the Oak Ridges Moraine:

 permanent and ephemeral streams,
 wetlands,
 kettle lakes and ponds, and their catchment areas,
 seepage areas and springs, and
 aquifers and other recharge areas.

This hydrological system is inter-twined with a regional flow systems not bound by the morphological limits of the moraine.  For this reason, environmentalists and researchers promote an aggressive protection strategy extending beyond the moraine, thus ensuring a contiguously protected hydrological system.

The preservation of aquifers is especially important, since they are used as a primary water source by some municipalities located on or near the moraine. These aquifers also discharge into tributaries that are the headwaters of creeks and rivers which eventually flow into Lake Simcoe, Lake Scugog and Lake Ontario.

The Oak Ridges Moraine's hydrological system is a major constituent of the Humber Watershed, so that any factors affecting the moraine may affect the connected systems. A specific concern is urbanization, which affects water quality by increasing its load of metals and organic contaminants. A study by Cook et al. (1985) found an increase in mean annual runoff, instantaneous discharge, and hydrograph peak flow as a result of urbanization: "...changes in land use coincided with changes in volumetric and time distribution aspects of hydrologic response".

Research on the moraine

In 1829, John Bigsby conducted the first investigation of the moraine. He noted the elevation, and styled the area Oak Ridge, identifying the portion of moraine north of Toronto. The moraine's extent was not established until 1863 when William Logan conducted the Geological Survey of Canada.

Taylor formally defined the landform as the Oak Ridges Moraine in 1913. He described its extent to be from King and Maple in the west to the Trent River in the east. He also proposed that its origin was overlapping, interlobate glaciation retreat, between the Lake Ontario Lobe and the older Lake Simcoe Lobe. This has become the accepted explanation for the moraine's development, though research in the 1970s suggested the moraine may not be interlobate.

Research conducted in the 1990s revealed that the moraine has multiple origins: its eastern area has subglacial depositions (Gorrell and McCrae, 1993); early parts of the moraine were deposited in an esker (Brennand and Shaw, 1994); and that the moraine is not continuous, but is composed of multiple depositional environments: subglacial, ice-marginal and proglacial lacustrine (Barnett et al., 1998).

Current research efforts on the moraine are quite extensive. Because of the political implications of development on the moraine, and because its aquifers are a source of potable water for numerous communities, both federal and provincial governments have invested resources towards research on the moraine. The Geological Survey of Canada and Ontario Geological Survey both investigate hydrostratigraphy and hydrology throughout the moraine.

Palaeo-Indian hunter-gatherers were in this area between 11,000 - 9,500 BP. The oldest artifact found in what is now Richmond Hill, Ontario, from these people, was a stone scraper about 40 mm long, at the Mortson Site, near Leslie Street and 19th Avenue. Other artifacts were found in a settlement site on the eastern shore of Lake Wilcox.

Late Archaic artifacts c. 3800 BP have also been found at the Silver Stream site, near the headwaters of the Rouge River on Leslie Street, just north of Major Mackenzie Drive, and at the Esox site, on the eastern shore of Lake Wilcox.

Political action

Although preservation of the moraine was first suggested in the 1940s, it was not until 1991 that the issue achieved prominence in political discourse. Part of the reason for its entry into political discourse, was due to the formation, in 1989, of the Save the Oak Ridges Moraine (STORM) Coalition.

The Government of Ontario created the Oak Ridges Moraine Technical Working Committee in June 1991, with the aim of creating a regional planning strategy for the moraine. The plan was completed in 1994, but was subsequently dismissed in favour of local government administration of the affected lands. This led to intense development on some portions of the moraine.

In early 1999, developers targeted Richmond Hill for large subdivisions on the moraine which would house over 100,000 people. On July 20, 1999, Minister of Municipal Affairs and Housing Steve Gilchrist announced, on "Rouge Park Day", that he would be implementing a ban on all development on the Oak Ridges Moraine. This announcement sparked considerable opposition by the development industry which, in turn, attracted considerable media attention and public interest. A media campaign by environmental groups built on the public opposition of the developments, and the issue was transferred to the Ontario Municipal Board (OMB) in 2000.

By May 2001, with the issue still unresolved, the provincial Conservative government announced a six-month moratorium on moraine development. A panel was formed to create a land-use plan consistent with the current "smart growth" policy. The plan was released in October 2001, and became the basis for Bill 122, the Oak Ridges Moraine Conservation Act, 2001, which divided the moraine into four zones with increasingly stringent controls on development in each. The Act prevented development of over 92% of the land mass of the moraine and only those development projects which had already received zoning and planning approval were allowed to be completed.

During the provincial election of 2003, the Liberal Party of Ontario promised to terminate development on the moraine as part of their election campaign. The government, in its attempt to halt developments, proposed the North Pickering Land Exchange.  This involved exchanging government-owned public lands in North Pickering (the Seaton lands) for privately owned lands on the Oak Ridges Moraine in Richmond Hill and Uxbridge. The exchange settled outstanding disputes being considered by the OMB involving moraine lands in Richmond Hill and Uxbridge.

Despite all these efforts, including the government's creation of a permanently protected Greenbelt, the political struggle regarding the moraine continues.

Unless approved prior to the Oak Ridges Moraine Conservation Act coming into force in 2001 or through orders of the Ontario Municipal Board to the contrary, development on the Oak Ridges Moraine is restricted to the Settlement Area. Smaller-scale development which improves the ecological integrity of the moraine is permitted in other areas (i.e., tree farm), but is otherwise restricted. Given that the land-subdivision process is lengthy and that Markham, Vaughan, Richmond Hill, Whitchurch-Stouffville and King Township are experiencing a shortage in servicing capacity, what often appears as "new" development in Markham, Vaughan, Richmond Hill, Whitchurch-Stouffville and King Township on the moraine is in the majority of cases development which has had approval for many years.

Development pressures
The greatest threat to the function of the moraine is land development on and below its surface, particularly in the headwaters. The estimated current population on the moraine land itself is roughly 200,000 but this number continues to grow at a frantic pace, with large urban developments occurring in Stouffville, Vaughan, Richmond Hill, and Aurora. This rapid development is especially apparent in Oak Ridges, where land previously set aside for conservation has, as of 2009, been opened up by the Richmond Hill Town Council for development. Another five million people live in close proximity. Use of the moraine is currently under dispute; environmental groups such as the Sierra Club maintain the area's delicate ecosystems are threatened by development pressures. Attractive forests and hilly relief typical of the moraine are a magnet for developers looking for building opportunities in the densely populated Greater Toronto Area. However, many planners and residents see a need to preserve the moraine from the negative aspects of urban sprawl.

Moreover, because it is a rich resource for sand and gravel, it has become a significant source of materials for the aggregate industry of the Greater Toronto Area.

Conservation
Fisher and Alexander in the early 1990s described a "metropolitan" invasion of the Oak Ridges Moraine, in response to which organizations such as Save the Oak Ridges Moraine (STORM) were formed. Conservation Authorities Moraine Coalition (CAMC) is a coalition of nine Conservation Authorities with watersheds on the Oak Ridges Moraine (ORM). The Coalition formed in 2000 two years prior to the ORM conservation Plan, in response to the need for a comprehensive policy, planning and management approach geared to sustaining the health of the entire ORM. The CAMC is a partnership organization. It collaborates with numerous groups and individuals to achieve common objectives to support a robust and resilient environment across the ORM landscape. These objectives include; undertaking science-based research; providing opportunities for recreation; taking action for the protection and restoration of the ORM and; providing expert advice for environmental planning and policy matters.

Local concerns for preserving wildlife habitat on the moraine have increased in recent years. In April 2000, the Oak Ridges Moraine Land Trust was formed. The ORMLT is a non-profit organization that raises funds to protect areas on the moraine through conservation easements and outright purchases. They have protected . The Nature Conservancy of Canada is also active and are raising funds to protect a  property called Happy Valley Forest.

See also
 Conservation Ontario
 Greenbelt (Golden Horseshoe)
 Terminal moraine
 List of glacial moraines

References and notes

External links

 Oak Ridges Moraine at the Government of Ontario Ministry of Municipal Affairs and Housing
 Oak Ridges Moraine Conservation Plan (2017) at the Government of Ontario Ministry of Municipal Affairs and Housing
 Oak Ridges Moraine Conservation Act, 2001 at Government of Ontario e-Laws
 Oak Ridges Moraine Land Trust

 
Moraines of Ontario
Natural history of Ontario
Landforms of the Regional Municipality of York
Landforms of the Regional Municipality of Durham
Landforms of the Regional Municipality of Peel
Aquifers in Canada